Joel Wood is a Cree musician from Maskwacis, Alberta, Canada. He is most noted for his album Singing Is Healing, which was a Juno Award nominee for Traditional Indigenous Artist of the Year at the Juno Awards of 2022.

He is the son of Steve Wood, a musician with the traditional Cree group Northern Cree with whom Joel has also performed as a member, and the cousin of Fawn Wood, a musician who was a fellow Juno nominee in the same category in 2022.

References

21st-century Canadian male singers
21st-century First Nations people
Cree people
First Nations musicians
Musicians from Alberta
Living people
Year of birth missing (living people)